Stian Berger Røsland (born 3 November 1976 in Oslo) is a Norwegian politician for the Conservative Party. He succeeded Erling Lae as Governing Mayor of Oslo in 2009. He served until 2015, when he was replaced by Labour politician Raymond Johansen after the Conservatives and allies narrowly lost the majority in Oslo city council in the 2015 local elections. He also served as commissioner of finance under Erling Lae from 2007 to 2009.

Personal life and education
Røsland is master of law from the University of Oslo. He is a lawyer and partner in the law firm Selmer DA. After resigning as governing mayor, he returned to the private sector in Oslo. 

Røsland is married to Marit Berger Røsland, a former Minister of European Affairs, and has two children. He is Catholic, said to be the first such individual to serve as mayor of Oslo since the Reformation.

Political career
Røsland became politically involved in his youth through the Young Conservatives. He was the leader of the Oslo Young Conservatives from 1996 to 1998 and a member of the Young Conservatives' central board from 1998 to 2002. Røsland was named one of Norway's greatest leadership talents in 2009.

Røsland became a permanent member of Oslo City Council in 1999. As the youngest member of the Conservative City Council group, he became the leader of the party's culture and education faction. After being city council secretary for Trine Skei Grande and Kjell Veivåg, Røsland was city council secretary for governing mayor Erling Lae between 2001 and 2003. Back in the city council after the 2003 local elections, Røsland became a full-time politician and deputy chairman of the transport and environment committee. He later became faction leader of the urban development committee. He was deputy leader of the Conservative Party's city council group between 2005 and 2007.

References

External links
http://www.byradet.oslo.kommune.no/byradslederens_side/
http://www.bbc.co.uk/news/uk-england-london-11904778

1976 births
Living people
Conservative Party (Norway) politicians
Politicians from Oslo
Norwegian Roman Catholics